This article discusses the Polish order of battle during the invasion of Poland. In the late 1930s Polish headquarters prepared "Plan Zachód" (Plan "West), a plan of mobilization of Polish Army in case of war with Germany. Earlier, the Poles did not regard the Germans as their main threat, priority was given to threat from the Soviets (see: Plan East).

The overall operational plan assumed the creation of thirty infantry divisions, nine reserve divisions, eleven cavalry brigades, two motorized brigades, three mountain brigades and a number of smaller units. Most Polish forces were grouped into six armies and a number of corps-sized "Operational Groups". Later in the course of the war other operational units were created.

Armies

Karpaty Army 

Created on July 11, 1939, under Major General Kazimierz Fabrycy. Armia Karpaty was created after Germany annexed Czechoslovakia and created a puppet state of Slovakia. The main aim of the army was to secure mountain passes in the Carpathians. Initially the army consisted of 2 improvised mountain brigades and a number of smaller units, but later in the course of war was joined by forces of the withdrawing Armia Kraków.

 2nd Mountain Brigade (2 Brygada Górska), made of National Defence units from Limanowa, Gorlice and Nowy Sącz, as well as Border Defence Corps units from Volhynia,
 3rd Mountain Brigade (3 Brygada Górska), made of National Defence units from Krosno, Sanok, Przemyśl and Rzeszów
 Carpathian Half-Brigade of National Defence (Karpacka Półbrygada ON)
 1st Motorized Artillery Regiment
 9th Heavy Artillery Regiment

Additionally, mobilisation plans called for creation of the Tarnów Group consisting of:

 22nd Mountain Infantry Division from Przemyśl,
 38th Infantry Division (reserve), created in August 1939 out of Border Defence Corps units from Polesie Voivodeship and Volhynian Voivodeship.

Kraków Army

Created on March 23, 1939, as the main pivot of Polish defence. Its main task was to delay advancing German troops and withdraw eastwards along the northern line of the Carpathians. It consisted of 5 infantry divisions, 1 mountain infantry division, 1 motorized cavalry brigade, 1 mountain brigade and 1 cavalry brigade under gen. Antoni Szylling.

Lublin Army

An improvised army created on September 4 from a motorized brigade and various smaller units concentrated around Lublin, Sandomierz and upper Vistula. Commanded by mj. gen. Tadeusz Piskor.

 Warsaw Armoured Motorized Brigade (Warszawska Brygada Pancerno-Motorowa)
 Smaller units

Łódź Army

Created on March 23, 1939, under gen. Juliusz Rómmel. Armia Łódź was to become a bolt between Armies "Kraków" and "Poznań". However, because of mistakes committed by Gen. Rómmel, the army was located too close to the German border and joined fighting from the very beginning of the campaign, which deprived it of any possibilities of cooperation with the surrounding units. It consisted of 4 infantry divisions and 2 cavalry brigades.

 2nd Legions Infantry Division (2 Dywizja Piechoty Legionów) from Kielce,
 10th Infantry Division (10 Dywizja Piechoty) from Łódź,
 28th Infantry Division (28 Dywizja Piechoty) from Łomża,
 30th Infantry Division (30 Dywizja Piechoty, reserve division) from Kobryn,
 Kresowa Cavalry Brigade (Kresowa Brygada Kawalerii) from Brody,
 Wołyńska Cavalry Brigade (Wołyńska Brygada Kawalerii) from Rowne,
 Sieradz National Defence Brigade (Sieradzka Brygada Obrony Narodowej)

Modlin Army

Created on March 23, 1939, for defence of Warsaw from the north. The army was to defend fortified lines along the border with East Prussia near Mława, and then retreat towards Narew river. Led by brig. gen. Emil Krukowicz-Przedrzymirski. Consisted of 2 infantry divisions and 2 cavalry brigades.

 8th Infantry Division (8 Dywizja Piechoty) from Modlin,
 20th Infantry Division (20 Dywizja Piechoty) from Baranowicze,
 Nowogródzka Cavalry Brigade (Nowogródzka Brygada Kawalerii) from Baranowicze,
 Mazowiecka Cavalry Brigade (Mazowiecka Brygada Kawalerii) from Warsaw,
 Warsaw National Defence Brigade (Warszawska Brygada Obrony Narodowej)

Pomorze Army

The Army was created on March 23, 1939, to defend Toruń and Bydgoszcz and to carry out delaying actions in the so-called "Polish Corridor". It was led by Lt.-Gen.  Władysław Bortnowski and consisted of five infantry divisions, two National Defence brigades and one cavalry brigade.

Poznań Army

The Armia Poznań led by mj. gen. Tadeusz Kutrzeba was to provide flanking operations in the Grand Poland and withdraw towards lines of defence along the Warta river. It consisted of 4 infantry divisions and 2 cavalry brigades.

 14th Infantry Division (14 Dywizja Piechoty) from Poznań
 17th Infantry Division (17 Dywizja Piechoty) from Gniezno
 25th Infantry Division (25 Dywizja Piechoty) from Kalisz
 26th Infantry Division (26 Dywizja Piechoty) from Skierniewice
 Wielkopolska Cavalry Brigade (Wielkopolska Brygada Kawalerii) from Poznań,
 Podolska Cavalry Brigade (Podolska Brygada Kawalerii) from Stanisławów.

Prusy Army

Under gen. Stefan Dąb-Biernacki. Created in the summer of 1939 as the main reserve of the Commander in Chief. According to the "Plan West" (Plan Zachód, code name for the Polish mobilization plan) it was to be composed of units mobilized as the second and third waves and its main purpose was to cooperate with the nearby armies "Poznań" and "Kraków".

Mobilized in two groups. Because of fast German advance both groups entered combat separately and most units did not reach full mobilization. It consisted of 6 infantry divisions, 1 cavalry brigade and a battalion of tanks.

Warszawa Army

Created on September 10, 1939, from various units in Warsaw and Modlin Fortress area. Initially it consisted of approximately 25 infantry battalions and 40 tanks. Later it was reinforced by forces of Łódź Army and elements of Modlin Army. It was commanded by col. Walerian Czuma, although the nominal commander was gen. Juliusz Rómmel.

Operational Groups

Operational Group Wyszków
Was one of the reserves of the northern front of Polish defences, created on September 1, 1939. According to Plan West, it was supposed to defend the line of the Narew river from Wehrmacht units advancing from East Prussia. Due to rapid German advance, the group withdrew towards the Bug river, and on September 11, Polish Commander in Chief Edward Rydz-Śmigły ordered General Wincenty Kowalski, commandant of Operational Group Wyszków, to merge his unit with Northern Front under General Stefan Dąb-Biernacki.

It consisted of the following units:

 1st Legions Infantry Division (Poland) (1 Dywizja Piechoty Legionów) from Wilno,
 35th Infantry Division (35 Dywizja Piechoty – reserve), formed on September 7, 1939, out of units of the Border Defence Corps from northern parts of the Wilno Voivodeship,
 41st Infantry Division (41 Dywizja Piechoty – reserve), formed in September 1939, out of units of the Border Defence Corps,
 Bartosz Glowacki (armoured train), 
 elements of 2nd Regiment of Heavy Artillery.

Independent Operational Group Narew

Consisted of 2 infantry divisions and 2 cavalry brigades:

 18th Infantry Division from Łomża,
 33rd Infantry Division ( – reserve), formed in late August 1939, out of Border Defence Corps units from the areas of Grodno and Wilno,
 Podlaska Cavalry Brigade from Białystok,
 Suwalska Cavalry Brigade from Suwałki and Grodno.

Independent Operational Group Polesie

Supporting forces
Air support
Lotnictwo Wojskowe (Polish Air Force)

Naval and river support
Polska Marynarka Wojenna (Polish Navy)

See also
 Polish cavalry brigade order of battle
 Border Guard
 Fall Weiss (1939)
 History of Poland
 Invasion of Poland
 List of Polish armies in World War II
 Polish armaments 1939–45
 Plan Wschod
 Soviet invasion of Poland

World War II orders of battle
Polish Land Forces
Invasion of Poland